Light in Darkness is the first full-length album by rock band Transparent, which was released on June 6, 2013. The album has eleven original songs including "Bridges" (the main menu song on NASCAR The Game: Inside Line that was released on November 6, 2012). The album was recorded over the span of 2011-2012. The album has exclusive artwork for each song and photography in the CD booklet done by Katie Cappadonia. The front cover of the CD is their pink and purple ribcage logo.

Track listing
 Breathe
 Paranoid
 Do or Die
 New World Order
 Bridges (featured on NASCAR The Game: Inside Line)
 Dear God
 Somewhere
 Unbreakable
 Love to Hate You
 March of the Damned
 Billboard of Pain

Band members on album
Matthew Sassano - lead singer and songwriter 
Bradley Meise - guitar 
Quintin Olix - guitar 
Ben Taft - screams

First single, "Bridges"
The song "Bridges" was written by lead singer, Matthew Sassano during October 2011 while he was on a trip to New Mexico and is based on the prodigal son in the Bible. The song almost got thrown out initially but the band decided to revive it. The song has received many positive reviews and became the main menu song on NASCAR The Game: Inside Line for Xbox, PlayStation and Wii. The previous year on the NASCAR game, the main menu song was from ZZ Top. During the summer and fall of 2012, Alfred State College Digital Media Animation students made the music video for Transparent's first single "Bridges" which is the main menu song on NASCAR The Game: Inside Line. The video has a sort of stop-motion appeal to it with a drawn out, watercolor effect to give it a sort of surrealistic look. The students who made the video made a snow mountain background within the film by setting up rocks, putting powder on them, and then give it a close-up shot with a blurred effect, making it blend with the rest of the background. The effect added to the hills were made in photoshop; they composited images of different backdrops within another photo of a hill. The smoke was created by liquid dynamics, experimenting with food coloring, alcohol, milk, and paint. 
There were many different storyboards and sketches, displaying character placement, the frames used, sketched out effects, and subtitles explaining the scene and how it was made. The effects used to place a background behind the characters was made with the use of the green screen and chroma keying. Over 6,000 frames were used within the project. The music video can be seen on YouTube and is available for sale on iTunes.

https://archive.today/20130217013934/http://dullko.wordpress.com/2012/11/26/lectureart-gallery-3-transparent-music-video/

External links
Official Transparent website

Transparent (New York rock band) albums
2013 debut albums